Guilherme Luiz Marques (born June 26, 1969 in Juiz de Fora) is a retired male beach volleyball player from Brazil, who won the gold medal at the 1997 World Championships in Los Angeles, California, partnering Rogerio Ferreira. Two years later the couple claimed the bronze medal at the World Championships in Marseille, France.

References
 

1969 births
Living people
Brazilian men's beach volleyball players
20th-century Brazilian people
People from Juiz de Fora